Archbishop Carroll High School is a Catholic, coeducational high school located in Dayton, Ohio, United States. It is run by the Roman Catholic Archdiocese of Cincinnati. Archbishop Carroll High School is recognized as the full, official name of the school on July 1, 2022.

History
Archbishop Carroll High School is named for John Carroll (1735–1815), the first bishop and subsequently the first archbishop of the United States. The school opened its doors to students on August 18, 1961. Carroll's first class graduated May 31, 1965.

Athletics
Carroll's mascot is the Patriot. The Carroll Patriot teams compete in the Greater Catholic League. Carroll's school colors of red, white, and blue.

Ohio High School Athletic Association State Championships:

 Boys Soccer– 1980, 2008, 2010, 2011, 2012

 Wrestling- State Dual Meet; 1998.

Notable alumni
Steve Austria – United States House of Representatives, Ohio's 7th congressional district
Kevin Kramer – Television writer since 2007 (Chowder, Harvey Beaks, Archibald's Next Big Thing)

References

Roman Catholic Archdiocese of Cincinnati
Catholic secondary schools in Ohio
Educational institutions established in 1961
High schools in Dayton, Ohio
1961 establishments in Ohio